Ganhetan (Mandarin: 甘河滩镇) is a town in Huangzhong District, Xining, Qinghai, China. In 2010, Ganhetan had a total population of 24,252: 13,484 males and 10,768 females: 4,306 aged under 14, 18,653 aged between 15 and 65 and 1,923 aged over 65.

References 
 

Township-level divisions of Qinghai
Xining
Towns in China